is a Japanese football player. He plays for Azul Claro Numazu.

Career
Tomoki Fujisaki joined J3 League club Azul Claro Numazu in 2017.

Club statistics
Updated to 22 February 2018.

References

External links
Profile at Azul Claro Numazu

1994 births
Living people
Kokushikan University alumni
Association football people from Chiba Prefecture
Japanese footballers
J3 League players
Azul Claro Numazu players
Association football defenders